This is a chronological list of WXW Tag Team Champions. The WXW Tag Team Championship is a professional wrestling tag team title created in 1996 as part of for Top Rope Productions (later renamed World Xtreme Wrestling).

Title history

References

External links
 WXW Tag Team Championship

World Xtreme Wrestling championships
Tag team wrestling championships